Prithvi Pankaj Shaw (born 9 November 1999) is an Indian international cricketer who played for the Indian cricket team in all formats. He currently plays for Mumbai in domestic cricket and Delhi Capitals in the Indian Premier League. He debuted at the age of 18 for India and holds record for being the youngest debutant to score a test century.  He was retained by Delhi Capitals ahead of the Tata Ipl Auction 2022. Under his captaincy, the Indian team won the 2018 Under-19 World Cup.

A right-handed opening batter, Shaw made his first international appearance on 4 October 2018 and became the second-youngest Indian after Sachin Tendulkar to make a Test century and the youngest Indian to do so on Test debut.

Shaw made his first-class debut for Mumbai in the semi-finals of the 2016–17 Ranji Trophy on 1 January 2017. He scored a century in the second innings and was man of the match. Shaw earned another distinction by scoring a century in his debut match of the Duleep Trophy and equalled the record held by Sachin Tendulkar who had scored for the first time a century each in his debut matches of Ranji Trophy and Duleep Trophy. In December 2017, Shaw was named captain of India's squad for the 2018 Under-19 Cricket World Cup. He led India in the final where they beat Australia by 8 wickets to win their fourth Under-19 World Cup.

The International Cricket Council (ICC) named Shaw as one of the five breakout stars in men's cricket in 2018. In July 2019, he was suspended by BCCI for doping violation till 15 November 2019.

Early and personal life 
Prithvi Shaw was Born in Thane, Maharashtra in a Bengali family. Shaw's parents moved from Gaya, Bihar to Thane as migrant for employment. In 2001, Shaw was offered a contract by AAP Entertainment that allowed him and his father to move from Thane to Mumbai and continue his cricketing education. He also received sponsorship from Indian Oil.

In 2013, Shaw and his father was featured in the documentary film Beyond All Boundaries, in which his story, sports journey was told. The documentry was narrated by Kunal Nayyar. It was aired on National Geographic.   He has twice selected to travel to England to further his cricketing education.

Shaw has earned a deal worth Rs 36 lakh with Sanspareils Greenlands (SG), which has been endorsed by stalwarts like Sunil Gavaskar, Rahul Dravid and Virender Sehwag in the past. 

In February 2023 youtuber Sapna Gill and her male friends followed Shaw's vehicle, vandalised it and manhandled him. He field a police case against them and she got arrested.

Domestic career 
Shaw played for Middle Income Group (MIG) Cricket Club in Mumbai and was the captain of Rizvi Springfield High School and the Mumbai under-16 team. In November 2013, he had set the highest score by any batsman in any organised form of cricket since 1901 when he hit 546 in a Harris Shield elite division match.

Shaw captained Rizvi Springfield team to two Harris Shield tournament titles in 2012 and 2013, which a prestigious trophy in Mumbai's youth cricket. In 2012, he scored 155 in the semi-final and 174 in the final match. Shaw trains and played for Middle Income Group Cricket Club in Mumbai, where Arjun Tendulkar, son of Sachin, was a teammate.

In April 2012, Shaw was invited to England to play for Cheadle Hulme School in Manchester and scored 1,446 runs during a two-month stay. He scored a century on debut. and averaged 84. He also took 68 wickets. During his time in Manchester, Prithvi made several appearances for local side High Lane Cricket club.

In 2013, Shaw played for Cryptics club against Middleton Stoney Cricket Club in Oxfordshire. He opened the batting and scored 68 in under 10 overs before a change of pace in English conditions led to his dismissal, caught off the bowling of Professor Paul Wordsworth. In this time, Shaw's opening partner had reached just 7 runs. He also bowled, taking 3 wickets for 1 run in 5 overs and completed a runout.

After once scoring 73 runs against a side from the Julian Wood Cricket Academy in England, the academy's founder, Julian Wood, offered Shaw a trip to England in May 2013 and a stint at the academy. On 6 February 2017, while playing in his fifth ODI for India under-19s, he scored his first century at under-19 level.

Shaw made his List A debut for Mumbai in the 2016–17 Vijay Hazare Trophy on 25 February 2017. In November 2017, in the 2017–18 Ranji Trophy, he scored his second consecutive century, and his fourth in five first-class matches since his debut, batting for Mumbai. Shaw scored his first List A century against Leicestershire on 19 June 2018 and scored 132 runs. In October 2018, he was named in India A's squad for the 2018–19 Deodhar Trophy.
In February 2021,  Prithvi Shaw scored an unbeaten double-century (227* off 152) against Pondicherry in the Vijay Hazare Trophy. Shaw's 227* is currently the best individual score within the tournament's history. Prithvi Shaw, after scoring 227* vs Pondicherry in the Vijay Hazare Trophy, now has the highest List A score by a captain in Men's cricket. He scored 827 runs in the same tournament which is the most runs in a single season. 

On 12 January 2023, in Ranji trophy he scored 379 in an inning against Assam, which is the second highest first class score by an Indian player behind B. B. Nimbalkar of Maharashtra cricket team.

He captained Mumbai in 2020-21 Vijay Hazare Trophy and the 2021-22 Ranji Trophy, reaching the final on both occasions. Mumbai beat Uttar Pradesh in the 2020-21 Vijay Hazare final but lost to Chandrakant Pandit's Madhya Pradesh in 2021 Ranji final. 

He is the only Indian Cricketer with a 50+ First Class average, 50+ List A average and 150+ T20 Strike Rate.

Indian Premier League 

In January 2018, Shaw was bought by the Delhi Daredevils in the 2018 IPL auction for ₹ 1.2 crores. On 23 April 2018, Shaw became the youngest player to open batting in the Indian Premier League history at the age of 18 and 165 days while playing for Delhi Daredevils during their match against Kings XI Punjab. He also had an impressive IPL debut scoring 22 runs in 10 balls.

On 27 April 2018, Prithvi Shaw notched up his first IPL fifty against the Kolkata Knight Riders and went on to become the joint youngest player to score an IPL fifty along with Sanju Samson (in 18 years and 169 days). His blistering knock of 62 runs helped Delhi Daredevils secure a comfortable 55-run victory against KKR. On 29 April 2021, Shaw became the second player to hit six boundaries in an over in the IPL, after Ajinkya Rahane, when he hit six boundaries off Shivam Mavi in the first over of the Delhi innings.

National record

In November 2013, Shaw established a new record of 546 runs from 330 balls playing for Rizvi Springfield in a Harris Shield match. It was the highest score in Indian schools cricket until the record was surpassed by Pranav Dhanawade on 4 January 2016 and is presently the 4th highest score by any batsman in any form of the organised game. Only AEJ Collins's 628* in 1899 and Charles Eady's 566 in 1901 are higher.

Previously the highest score recorded by an Indian in any form of registered competitive cricket was 515 by Dadabhoy Havewala in 1933.

Shaw's innings lasted six hours and seven minutes and contained 85 fours and five sixes before he was caught and bowled. Rizvi scored 991 runs having bowled out their opponents, St Francis d'Assisi, for 93.

The innings attracted significant media attention, particularly as it came only four days after the official retirement from international cricket of Tendulkar, who had scored 326 in the same tournament in 1988. "Less than a week after India bid its final farewell to the Little Master, the Master’s Apprentice conjured an innings of almost supernatural brilliance," wrote Howard Swains in a Freaky Good Futures profile of Shaw.

International career

In August 2018, Shaw was called up to India's Test squad for the final two Tests against England, but he did not play. In September 2018, he was named in India's Test squad for their series against the West Indies. Shaw made his Test debut against West Indies on 4 October 2018. In that match, he scored his maiden century in Tests and became the youngest batsman to make a Test century on debut for India (18 years and 319 days). India won the second Test by ten wickets, with Shaw being named the Player of the Series. In January 2020, Shaw was named in India's One Day International (ODI) squad for their series against New Zealand. He made his ODI debut for India, against New Zealand, on 5 February 2020. He was also Selected For Test Series In New Zealand and Scored one half-century in 4 innings He Played In That series. In 2020, Shaw was selected in the test squad for the Australian tour. In December 2020, Shaw had a poor performance in the first Test against Australia, scoring 0 and 4 in which his batting technique was questioned and was dropped in the next match.

In June 2021, he was named in India's One Day International (ODI) and Twenty20 International (T20I) squads for their series against Sri Lanka. He scored 43 runs off 24 balls in the first ODI of the 3-match series. He made his T20I debut on 25 July 2021, for India against Sri Lanka.

In July 2021, Shaw was called up as a replacement to India's Test squad for their series but did not play so against England.

References

External links 
 

Living people
1999 births
Indian cricketers
India Test cricketers
India One Day International cricketers
India Twenty20 International cricketers
Mumbai cricketers
Cricketers from Mumbai
Schools cricket
Delhi Capitals cricketers
Indian A cricketers
Doping cases in cricket
Cricketers who made a century on Test debut